Ivon Vernon Wilson  (1885–1974) was a notable New Zealand dentist and regional promoter. He was born in Dunedin, New Zealand, in 1885.

In 1953, Wilson was awarded the Queen Elizabeth II Coronation Medal. In the 1964 New Year Honours, he was appointed an Officer of the Order of the British Empire, for services to the community.

References

1885 births
1974 deaths
People from Dunedin in health professions
New Zealand dentists
New Zealand Officers of the Order of the British Empire
People educated at Southland Boys' High School
20th-century dentists